The China Historical Geographic Information System (CHGIS) is a Historical GIS project for creating a database of populated places and historical administrative units for the period of Chinese history between 222 BCE and 1911 CE. The project creates a dataset which tracks changes in place names, administrative status, and geography. It is a joint project of Harvard University and Fudan University. Its director is Professor Peter K. Bol of Harvard.

See also
Geographic Information Systems in China
China Biographical Database (CBDB)

References

External links
 Project homepage at Harvard
 Project homepage at Fudan

Historical geographic information systems
Geographic history of China
Harvard University
Fudan University